Alexander Johansson may refer to:

 Alexander Johansson (ice hockey) (born 1988), Swedish ice hockey forward
 Alexander Johansson (footballer, born 1995), Swedish football forward
 Alexander Johansson (footballer, born 2000), Swedish football striker